Aydıncık is a town and district of Yozgat Province in the Central Anatolia region of Turkey. According to 2012 census, population of the district is 11,065 of which 2,494 live in the town of Aydıncık.

Notes

References

External links
 District governor's official website 
 District municipality's official website 
 General information on Aydıncık 

Populated places in Yozgat Province
Districts of Yozgat Province
Towns in Turkey